Man at the Top is a 1973 British drama film directed by Mike Vardy and starring Kenneth Haigh, spun off from the television series Man at the Top, which itself was inspired by the 1959 film Room at the Top and its 1965 sequel Life at the Top.

Plot
Joe Lampton is promoted to managing director of a pharmaceutical company, and becomes involved with Lord Ackerman, the powerful chairman, who is also his father-in-law. But Joe makes a shocking discovery: his predecessor committed suicide because of his involvement in a drug that left 1,000 African women sterile. Joe threatens to reveal all to the press, while Lord Ackerman seeks to persuade him otherwise, by offering him promotion to Chief Executive.

Cast
 Kenneth Haigh as Joe Lampton
 Nanette Newman as Lady Alex Ackerman
 Harry Andrews as Lord Ackerman
 William Lucas as Marshall
 Clive Swift as Massey
 Paul Williamson as Tarrant
 John Collin as Wisbech
 John Quentin as Digby
 Danny Sewell as Weston
 Charlie Williams as George Harvey
 Anne Cunningham as Mrs. Harvey
 Angela Bruce as Joyce
 Margaret Heald as Eileen
 Mary Maude as Robin Ackerman
 Norma West as Sarah Tarrant
 John Conteh as Boxer

Production

Filming
Shooting took place from 3 March to 7 April 1973.

Reception

Box office
The film was not a success at the box office.

Critical reception
Monthly Film Bulletin said it was "too much like an episode of a TV series stretched to feature length".

"Network on Air" noted the film as, "offering a grittier treatment than the 1959 film adaptation and the subsequent television series".

Allmovie noted, " Nanette Newman, a busy doe-eyed ingenue of the 1960s, is quietly effective as the middle-aged Mrs. Lampton."

References

External links
 
Man at the Top at BFI

1973 films
British drama films
1973 drama films
Films shot at EMI-Elstree Studios
Films based on television series
Films based on works by John Braine
Films scored by Roy Budd
EMI Films films
1970s English-language films
1970s British films